The Fu Lei Translation and Publishing Award (French: Le Prix Fu Lei) (Chinese: 傅雷翻译出版奖) is an award established in 2009 by the French Embassy in China to recognize the works of Chinese translators and publishers translated from French publications. It is named for the Chinese translator Fu Lei and is awarded annually. There are different categories of awards, including the Jeune Pousse [Young Shoot] award made to the best new translator.

Recipients of the Fu Lei Award

2009 (1st Awards)
 MA Zhenchi 马振骋, for translation of Les Essais de Michel de Montaigne - 《蒙田随笔全集》 - Literature
 ZHANG Zujian 张祖建, for translation of "La Voie des Masques", written by Claude Lévi-Strauss -《面具之道》 - Essay

2010 (2nd Awards)
 LI Yumin 李玉民, for translation of Chagrin D'École, written by Daniel Pennac - 《上学的烦恼》 - Literature
 HU Xiaoyue 胡小跃, for translation of Gaston Gallimard：Un demi-siècle d'édition française, written by Pierre Assouline - 《加斯东·伽利玛：半个世纪的法国出版史》 - Essay

2011 (3rd Awards)
 JIN Longge 金龙格, for translation of Dans le café de la jeunesse perdue, written by Patrick Modiano -《青春咖啡馆》 - Literature
 YANG Yaping 杨亚平, Zhao Jingli 赵静利 and Li Wei 尹伟, for translation of La France des Lumières (1715-1789) written by Pierre-Yves Beaurepaire -《启蒙运动中的法国》 - Essay

2012 (4th Awards)
 GUO Hongan 郭宏安, for translation of Recueil, written by Albert Camus -《加缪文集》 - Literature
 ZHENG Kelu 郑克鲁, for translation of Le Deuxième Sexe, written by Simone de Beauvoir -《第二性》 - Essay

2013 (5th Awards)
 LIU Fang, for her translation of Le Rapport de Brodeck, written by Philippe Claudel - Literature
 SHEN Jian and ZHU Xiaohan, for their translation of L'enfant et la vie familiale sous l'Ancien Régime, written by Philippe Ariès - Essay
 CAO Dongxue, for her translation of De la démocratie en Amérique, written by Alexis de Tocqueville - Young Shoot

2014 (6th Awards)
 AN Ning, for translation of Naissance d’un pont, written by Maylis de Kerangal - LIterature
 CAI Hongbin, for translation of L’avenir dure longtemps, written by Louis Althusser - Essay
 YU Jiale, for translation of Bouquiner : Autobiobibliographie, written by Annie François - Young Shoot

2015 (7th Awards)
 ZHOU Xiaoshen, for translation of Le Liseur du 6h 27, written by Jean-Paul Didierlaurent - Literature
 XU Minglong, for translation of Description de J.-B. Du Halde (1735) - Essay
 WANG Minnan, for translation of La querelle de l'art contemporain, written by Marc Jimenez - Young Shoot

2016 (8th Awards)
 JIN Jufang, for translation of L'Acacia, written by Claude Simon - Literature
 ZHOU Peiqiong, for translation of Dans les forêts de Sibérie, written by Sylvain Tesson - Young Shoot

2017 (9th Awards)
 LIN Yuan, for his translation of Retour à Killybegs, written by Sorj Chalandon - Literature
 ZHANG Jujian, for his translation of La misère du monde, written by Pierre Bourdieu - Essay
 MA Jiening, for his translation of Tocqueville : Les sources aristocratiques de la liberté, written by Lucien Jaume - Young Shoot

2018 (10th Awards)

 YUAN Xiaoyi, for translation of Chanson douce, by Leïla Slimani - Literature
 LIANG Shuang and TIAN Meng, for their translation of Le dimanche de Bouvines, by Georges Duby - Essay
 ZHOU Lihong and JIAO Jingshu, for their translation of Les aveux du roman, Le dix-neuvième siècle entre Ancien Régime et Révolution, by Mona Ozouf  - Young Shoot
2019 (11th Awards)

 JIN Longge for his translation of D’un château l’autre (Castle to Castle),  published by Louis-Ferdinand Céline - fiction
 ZHANG Gen for his translation of Subjectivité et Vérité (Subjectivity and Truth), by Michel Foucault - essay
 KONG Qian for her translation of Kaouther Adimi’s Nos Richesses (Our Riches) by Kaouther Adimi - Young Translator

2020 (12th Awards)

 NING Chunyan, for her translation of Dans la Solitude des Champs de Coton, by Bernard-Marie Koltès - Literature
 WANG Wei, for his translation of Jean-Jacques Rousseau: La Transparence et L'obstacle, by Jean Starobinski - Essay
 ZENG Zhaokuang, for his translation of Juger la Reine, by Emmanuel de Waresquiel  - Young Shoot
2021 (13th Awards)

 HUANG Yaqin for her translation of The Boy by Marcus Malte - Literature
 ZHANG Wen for her translation of The Experience of the Foreign: Culture and Translation in Romantic Germany by Antoine Berman - Essay 
 WANG Xian for her translation of Returning to Reims by Didier Eribon - Young shoot

Notes

External links
 Fu Lei Translation and Publishing Award on Chinese Wikipedia

Translation awards
Awards established in 2009